Let Them Fall in Love is the tenth studio album by American singer CeCe Winans. It was released by PureSprings Gospel on February 3, 2017.

Critical reception

AllMusic editor Andy Kellman called the album "a pleasant surprise from CeCe Winans. It's a retrofitted return that should appeal to anyone with an appreciation for Brill Building pop, early Motown, the Staple Singers, and Aretha Franklin circa "Amazing Grace" [...] Each song's message cuts clean through."

Track listing
All tracks produced by Alvin Love III and Tommy Sims.

Personnel
Tim Akers, Chase Akers, Billy Gaines, Gene Miller, Michael Mishaw, Peter Penrose, Joey Richey, Chris Rodriguez, Kevin Whalum - Background Vocals (10)

Charts

Weekly charts

Year-end charts

References 

2017 albums
CeCe Winans albums